The South-Eastern Norway Regional Health Authority is the largest of the four Regional health authorities in Norway. It covers the counties of Viken, Oslo, Innlandet, Vestfold og Telemark, and Agder, with 57% of the total population in Norway. The authority owns ten health trusts that operate the hospitals as well as the Hospital pharmacy enterprise that operates seventeen pharmacies and Sykehuspartner Trust that operates the information technology systems.

The authority is subordinate to the Norwegian Ministry of Health and Care Services and was created on 1 June 2007 when Eastern Norway Regional Health Authority and Southern Norway Regional Health Authority merged.

-

Government agencies of Norway
Health trusts of Norway
Companies based in Hamar
Norwegian companies established in 2007